The mind is the set of faculties responsible for all mental phenomena. Often the term is also identified with the phenomena themselves. These faculties include thought, imagination, memory, will, and sensation. They are responsible for various mental phenomena, like perception, pain experience, belief, desire, intention, and emotion. Various overlapping classifications of mental phenomena have been proposed. Important distinctions group them according to whether they are sensory, propositional, intentional, conscious, or occurrent. Minds were traditionally understood as substances but it is more common in the contemporary perspective to conceive them as properties or capacities possessed by humans and higher animals. Various competing definitions of the exact nature of the mind or mentality have been proposed. Epistemic definitions focus on the privileged epistemic access the subject has to these states. Consciousness-based approaches give primacy to the conscious mind and allow unconscious mental phenomena as part of the mind only to the extent that they stand in the right relation to the conscious mind. According to intentionality-based approaches, the power to refer to objects and to represent the world is the mark of the mental. For behaviorism, whether an entity has a mind only depends on how it behaves in response to external stimuli while functionalism defines mental states in terms of the causal roles they play. Central questions for the study of mind, like whether other entities besides humans have minds or how the relation between body and mind is to be conceived, are strongly influenced by the choice of one's definition.

Mind or mentality is usually contrasted with body, matter or physicality. The issue of the nature of this contrast and specifically the relation between mind and brain is called the mind-body problem. Traditional viewpoints included dualism and idealism, which consider the mind to be non-physical. Modern views often center around physicalism and functionalism, which hold that the mind is roughly identical with the brain or reducible to physical phenomena such as neuronal activity though dualism and idealism continue to have many supporters. Another question concerns which types of beings are capable of having minds. For example, whether mind is exclusive to humans, possessed also by some or all animals, by all living things, whether it is a strictly definable characteristic at all, or whether mind can also be a property of some types of human-made machines. Different cultural and religious traditions often use different concepts of mind, resulting in different answers to these questions. Some see mind as a property exclusive to humans whereas others ascribe properties of mind to non-living entities (e.g. panpsychism and animism), to animals and to deities. Some of the earliest recorded speculations linked mind (sometimes described as identical with soul or spirit) to theories concerning both life after death, and cosmological and natural order, for example in the doctrines of Zoroaster, the Buddha, Plato, Aristotle, and other ancient Greek, Indian and, later, Islamic and medieval European philosophers.

Psychologists such as Freud and James, and computer scientists such as Turing developed influential theories about the nature of the mind. The possibility of nonbiological minds is explored in the field of artificial intelligence, which works closely in relation with cybernetics and information theory to understand the ways in which information processing by nonbiological machines is comparable or different to mental phenomena in the human mind. The mind is also sometimes portrayed as the stream of consciousness where sense impressions and mental phenomena are constantly changing.

Etymology
The original meaning of Old English gemynd was the faculty of memory, not of thought in general. Hence call to mind, come to mind, keep in mind, to have mind of, etc. The word retains this sense in Scotland. Old English had other words to express "mind", such as hyge "mind, spirit".

The meaning of "memory" is shared with Old Norse, which has munr. The word is originally from a PIE verbal root , meaning "to think, remember", whence also Latin mens "mind", Sanskrit  "mind" and Greek μένος "mind, courage, anger".

The generalization of mind to include all mental faculties, thought, volition, feeling and memory, gradually develops over the 14th and 15th centuries.

Definitions 
The mind is often understood as a faculty that manifests itself in mental phenomena like sensation, perception, thinking, reasoning, memory, belief, desire, emotion and motivation. Mind or mentality is usually contrasted with body, matter or physicality. Central to this contrast is the intuition that minds exhibit various features not found in and maybe even incompatible with the material universe as described by the natural sciences. On the traditionally dominant substantialist view associated with René Descartes, minds are defined as independent thinking substances. But it is more common in contemporary philosophy to conceive minds not as substances but as properties or capacities possessed by humans and higher animals.

Despite this agreement, there is still a lot of difference of opinion concerning what the exact nature of mind is and various competing definitions have been proposed. Philosophical definitions of mind usually proceed not just by listing various types of phenomena belonging to the mind but by searching the "mark of the mental": a feature that is shared by all mental states and only by mental states. Epistemic approaches define mental states in terms of the privileged epistemic access the subject has to these states. This is often combined with a consciousness-based approach, which emphasizes the primacy of consciousness in relation to mind. Intentionality-based approaches, on the other hand, see the power of minds to refer to objects and represent the world as being a certain way as the mark of the mental. According to behaviorism, whether an entity has a mind only depends on how it behaves in response to external stimuli while functionalism defines mental states in terms of the causal roles they play. The differences between these diverse approaches are substantial since they result in very different answers to questions like whether animals or computers have minds.

There is a great variety of mental states. They fall into categories like sensory and non-sensory or conscious and unconscious. Various of the definitions listed above excel for states from one category but struggle to account for why states from another category are also part of the mind. This has led some theorists to doubt that there is a mark of the mental. So maybe the term "mind" just refers to a cluster of loosely related ideas that do not share one unifying feature. Some theorists have responded to this by narrowing their definitions of mind to "higher" intellectual faculties, like thinking, reasoning and memory. Others try to be as inclusive as possible regarding "lower" intellectual faculties, like sensing and emotion.

In popular usage, mind is frequently synonymous with thought: the private conversation with ourselves that we carry on "inside our heads". Thus we "make up our minds", "change our minds" or are "of two minds" about something. One of the key attributes of the mind in this sense is that it is a private sphere to which no one but the owner has access. No one else can "know our mind". They can only interpret what we consciously or unconsciously communicate.

Epistemic and consciousness-based approaches 
Epistemic approaches emphasize that the subject has privileged access to all or at least some of their mental states. It is sometimes claimed that this access is direct, private and infallible. Direct access refers to non-inferential knowledge. When someone is in pain, for example, they know directly that they are in pain, they do not need to infer it from other indicators like a body part being swollen or their tendency to scream when it is touched. But we arguably also have non-inferential knowledge of external objects, like trees or cats, through perception, which is why this criterion by itself is not sufficient. Another epistemic privilege often mentioned is that mental states are private in contrast to public external facts. For example, the fallen tree lying on a person's leg is directly open to perception by the bystanders while the victim's pain is private: only they know it directly while the bystanders have to infer it from their screams. It was traditionally often claimed that we have infallible knowledge of our own mental states, i.e. that we cannot be wrong about them when we have them. So when someone has an itching sensation, for example, they cannot be wrong about having this sensation. They can only be wrong about the non-mental causes, e.g. whether it is the consequence of bug bites or of a fungal infection. But various counterexamples have been presented to claims of infallibility, which is why this criterion is usually not accepted in contemporary philosophy. One problem for all epistemic approaches to the mark of the mental is that they focus mainly on conscious states but exclude unconscious states. A repressed desire, for example, is a mental state to which the subject lacks the forms of privileged epistemic access mentioned.

One way to respond to this worry is to ascribe a privileged status to conscious mental states. On such a consciousness-based approach, conscious mental states are non-derivative constituents of the mind while unconscious states somehow depend on their conscious counterparts for their existence. An influential example of this position is due to John Searle, who holds that unconscious mental states have to be accessible to consciousness to count as "mental" at all. They can be understood as dispositions to bring about conscious states. This position denies that the so-called "deep unconscious", i.e. mental contents inaccessible to consciousness, exists. Another problem for consciousness-based approaches, besides the issue of accounting for the unconscious mind, is to elucidate the nature of consciousness itself.  Consciousness-based approaches are usually interested in phenomenal consciousness, i.e. in qualitative experience, rather than access consciousness, which refers to information being available for reasoning and guiding behavior. Conscious mental states are normally characterized as qualitative and subjective, i.e. that there is something it is like for a subject to be in these states. Opponents of consciousness-based approaches often point out that despite these attempts, it is still very unclear what the term "phenomenal consciousness" is supposed to mean. This is important because not much would be gained theoretically by defining one ill-understood term in terms of another. Another objection to this type of approach is to deny that the conscious mind has a privileged status in relation to the unconscious mind, for example, by insisting that the deep unconscious exists.

Intentionality-based approaches 
Intentionality-based approaches see intentionality as the mark of the mental. The originator of this approach is Franz Brentano, who defined intentionality as the characteristic of mental states to refer to or be about objects. One central idea for this approach is that minds represent the world around them, which is not the case for regular physical objects. So a person who believes that there is ice cream in the fridge represents the world as being a certain way. The ice cream can be represented but it does not itself represent the world. This is why a mind is ascribed to the person but not to the ice cream, according to the intentional approach. One advantage of it in comparison to the epistemic approach is that it has no problems to account for unconscious mental states: they can be intentional just like conscious mental states and thereby qualify as constituents of the mind. But a problem for this approach is that there are also some non-mental entities that have intentionality, like maps or linguistic expressions. One response to this problem is to hold that the intentionality of non-mental entities is somehow derivative in relation to the intentionality of mental entities. For example, a map of Addis Ababa may be said to represent Addis Ababa not intrinsically but only extrinsically because people interpret it as a representation. Another difficulty is that not all mental states seem to be intentional. So while beliefs and desires are forms of representation, this seems not to be the case for pains and itches, which may indicate a problem without representing it. But some theorists have argued that even these apparent counterexamples should be considered intentional when properly understood.

Behaviorism and functionalism 
Behaviorist definitions characterize mental states as dispositions to engage in certain publicly observable behavior as a reaction to particular external stimuli. On this view, to ascribe a belief to someone is to describe the tendency of this person to behave in certain ways. Such an ascription does not involve any claims about the internal states of this person, it only talks about behavioral tendencies. A strong motivation for such a position comes from empiricist considerations stressing the importance of observation and the lack thereof in the case of private internal mental states. This is sometimes combined with the thesis that we could not even learn how to use mental terms without reference to the behavior associated with them. One problem for behaviorism is that the same entity often behaves differently despite being in the same situation as before. This suggests that explanation needs to make reference to the internal states of the entity that mediate the link between stimulus and response. This problem is avoided by functionalist approaches, which define mental states through their causal roles but allow both external and internal events in their causal network. On this view, the definition of pain-state may include aspects such as being in a state that "tends to be caused by bodily injury, to produce the belief that something is wrong with the body and ... to cause wincing or moaning".

One important aspect of both behaviorist and functionalist approaches is that, according to them, the mind is multiply realizable. This means that it does not depend on the exact constitution of an entity for whether it has a mind or not. Instead, only its behavioral dispositions or its role in the causal network matter. The entity in question may be a human, an animal, a silicon-based alien or a robot. Functionalists sometimes draw an analogy to the software-hardware distinction where the mind is likened to a certain type of software that can be installed on different forms of hardware. Closely linked to this analogy is the thesis of computationalism, which defines the mind as an information processing system that is physically implemented by the neural activity of the brain.

One problem for all of these views is that they seem to be unable to account for the phenomenal consciousness of the mind emphasized by consciousness-based approaches. It may be true that pains are caused by bodily injuries and themselves produce certain beliefs and moaning behavior. But the causal profile of pain remains silent on the intrinsic unpleasantness of the painful experience itself. Some states that are not painful to the subject at all may even fit these characterizations.

Forms

Mental faculties

Broadly speaking, mental faculties are the various functions of the mind, or things the mind can "do".

Thought is a mental act that allows humans to make sense of things in the world, and to represent and interpret them in ways that are significant, or which accord with their needs, attachments, goals, commitments, plans, ends, desires, etc. Thinking involves the symbolic or semiotic mediation of ideas or data, as when we form concepts, engage in problem solving, reasoning, and making decisions. Words that refer to similar concepts and processes include deliberation, cognition, ideation, discourse and imagination.

Thinking is sometimes described as a "higher" cognitive function and the analysis of thinking processes is a part of cognitive psychology. It is also deeply connected with our capacity to make and use tools; to understand cause and effect; to recognize patterns of significance; to comprehend and disclose unique contexts of experience or activity; and to respond to the world in a meaningful way.

Memory is the ability to preserve, retain and subsequently recall knowledge, information, or experience. Although memory has traditionally been a persistent theme in philosophy, the late nineteenth and early twentieth centuries also saw the study of memory emerge as a subject of inquiry within the paradigms of cognitive psychology. In recent decades, it has become one of the pillars of a new branch of science called cognitive neuroscience, a marriage between cognitive psychology and neuroscience.

Imagination is the activity of generating or evoking novel situations, images, ideas or other qualia in the mind. It is a characteristically subjective activity, rather than a direct or passive experience. The term is technically used in psychology for the process of reviving in the mind percepts of objects formerly given in sense perception. Since this use of the term conflicts with that of ordinary language, some psychologists have preferred to describe this process as "imaging" or "imagery" or to speak of it as "reproductive" as opposed to "productive" or "constructive" imagination. Things imagined are said to be seen in the "mind's eye". Among the many practical functions of imagination are the ability to project possible futures (or histories), to "see" things from another's perspective, and to change the way something is perceived, including to make decisions to respond to, or enact, what is imagined.

Consciousness in mammals (this includes humans) is an aspect of the mind generally thought to comprise qualities such as subjectivity, sentience, and the ability to perceive the relationship between oneself and one's environment. It is a subject of much research in philosophy of mind, psychology, neuroscience, and cognitive science. Some philosophers divide consciousness into phenomenal consciousness, which is subjective experience itself, and access consciousness, which refers to the global availability of information to processing systems in the brain. Phenomenal consciousness has many different experienced qualities, often referred to as qualia. Phenomenal consciousness is usually consciousness of something or about something, a property known as intentionality in philosophy of mind.

Categories of mental phenomena 
The mental phenomena brought about by the faculties of the mind have been categorized according to various distinctions. Important distinctions group mental phenomena together according to whether they are sensory, qualitative, propositional, intentional, conscious, occurrent or rational. These different distinctions result in overlapping categorizations. Some mental phenomena, like perception or bodily awareness, are sensory, i.e. based on the senses. These phenomena are of special interest to empiricists, who hold that they are our only source of knowledge about the external world. They are contrasted with non-sensory phenomena like thoughts or beliefs, which do not involve sense impressions. Sensory states are closely related to qualitative states, which have qualia and are therefore associated with a subjective feeling of what it is like to be in this state. Sensory and qualitative states are often contrasted with propositional states, which are sometimes said to be non-sensory and non-qualitative. Propositional states involve attitudes, like belief or desire, which a subject has towards a proposition. One problem with this contrast is that some propositional attitudes may have a subjective feeling to them, which would make them qualitative phenomena. This is the case, for example, when actively desiring something. Another problem with this contrast is that some mental phenomena, like perceptions, are both sensory and propositional. Propositional attitudes are intentional states, which have as their characteristic that they refer to or are about objects or states of affairs. Some philosophers see intentionality as the mark of the mental, i.e. as what is shared by all and only by mental phenomena. Opponents of this position have argued that there are various mental phenomena, like pains and itches, that lack the representational aspect associated with intentionality and therefore count as non-intentional. This claim is sometimes even extended to all sensory phenomena. It sometimes held that all intentional states are propositional. While this is true for the paradigmatic cases, it has been argued that there is a form of object-directed intentionality, like the fear of snakes, that does not involve propositional attitudes, like the fear that one will be bitten by snakes.

Another important distinction among mental states is whether they are conscious or not. Often two types of consciousness are distinguished: phenomenal consciousness and access consciousness. Phenomenal consciousness refers to actual experience. A common view is that some states, like sensations or pains, are necessarily associated with phenomenal consciousness while other states, like beliefs and desires, can be present both with and without phenomenal consciousness. According to some views, conscious mental states are more basic while unconscious states only count as mental if they can arise in phenomenal consciousness. Access consciousness, on the other hand, refers to mental states that are accessible: they carry information that is available for reasoning and guiding behavior. This notion is closely related to occurrent mental states, which are not just accessible but also currently active or causally efficacious within the owner's mind. All phenomenally conscious mental states are occurrent but there may also be unconscious occurrent states, like repressed desires, that influence our behavior. Occurrent mental states contrast with standing or dispositional mental states, which are part of the subject's mind even though they currently play no role in it. Mental phenomena are rational if they are well justified or obey the norms of rationality. Irrational mental phenomena, on the other hand, violate these norms. But not all mental phenomena are rationally evaluable: some are arational and exist outside the domain of rationality. They include urges, dizziness or hunger while beliefs and intentions are the paradigmatic examples of rationally evaluable states. Some hold that rationality depends only on structural principles that govern how different mental states should relate to each other while others define rationality in terms of responding correctly to reasons.

Mental contents
Mental contents are those items that are thought of as being "in" the mind, and capable of being formed and manipulated by mental processes and faculties. Examples include thoughts, concepts, memories, emotions, percepts and intentions. Philosophical theories of mental content include internalism, externalism, representationalism and intentionality.

Memetics is a theory of mental content based on an analogy with Darwinian evolution, which was originated by Richard Dawkins and Douglas Hofstadter in the 1980s. It is an evolutionary model of cultural information transfer. A meme, analogous to a gene, is an idea, belief, pattern of behaviour (etc.) "hosted" in one or more individual minds, and can reproduce itself from mind to mind. Thus what would otherwise be regarded as one individual influencing another to adopt a belief, is seen memetically as a meme reproducing itself.

Relation to the brain

In animals, the brain, or encephalon (Greek for "in the head"), is the control center of the central nervous system, responsible for thought. In most animals, the brain is located in the head, protected by the skull and close to the primary sensory apparatus of vision, hearing, equilibrioception, taste and olfaction. While all vertebrates have a brain, most invertebrates have either a centralized brain or collections of individual ganglia. Primitive animals such as sponges do not have a brain at all. Brains can be extremely complex. For example, the human brain contains around 86 billion neurons, each linked to as many as 10,000 others.

Understanding the relationship between the brain and the mind –the mind–body problem – is one of the central issues in the history of philosophy, a challenging problem both philosophically and scientifically. There are three major philosophical schools of thought concerning the answer: dualism, materialism, and idealism. Dualism holds that the mind exists independently of the brain; materialism holds that mental phenomena are identical to neuronal phenomena; and idealism holds that only mental phenomena exist.

Through most of history many philosophers found it inconceivable that cognition could be implemented by a physical substance such as brain tissue (that is neurons and synapses). Descartes, who thought extensively about mind-brain relationships, found it possible to explain reflexes and other simple behaviors in mechanistic terms, although he did not believe that complex thought, especially language, could be explained by reference to the physical brain alone.

The most straightforward scientific evidence of a strong relationship between the physical brain matter and the mind is the impact physical alterations to the brain have on the mind, such as with traumatic brain injury and psychoactive drug use. Philosopher Patricia Churchland notes that drug-mind interaction indicates an intimate connection between the brain and the mind.

In addition to the philosophical questions, the relationship between mind and brain involves a number of scientific questions, including understanding the relationship between mental activity and brain activity, the exact mechanisms by which drugs influence cognition, and the neural correlates of consciousness.

Theoretical approaches to explain how mind emerges from the brain include connectionism, computationalism and Bayesian brain.

Evolution
The evolution of human intelligence refers to several theories that aim to describe how human intelligence has evolved in relation to the evolution of the human brain and the origin of language.

The timeline of human evolution spans some 7 million years, from the separation of the genus Pan until the emergence of behavioral modernity by 50,000 years ago. Of this timeline, the first 3 million years concern Sahelanthropus, the following 2 million concern Australopithecus, while the final 2 million span the history of actual Homo species (the Paleolithic).

Many traits of human intelligence, such as empathy, theory of mind, mourning, ritual, and the use of symbols and tools, are already apparent in great apes although in lesser sophistication than in humans.

There is a debate between supporters of the idea of a sudden emergence of intelligence, or "Great leap forward" and those of a gradual or continuum hypothesis.

Theories of the evolution of intelligence include:
 Robin Dunbar's social brain hypothesis
 Geoffrey Miller's sexual selection hypothesis concerning Sexual selection in human evolution
 The ecological dominance-social competition (EDSC) explained by Mark V. Flinn, David C. Geary and Carol V. Ward based mainly on work by Richard D. Alexander.
 The idea of intelligence as a signal of good health and resistance to disease.
 The Group selection theory contends that organism characteristics that provide benefits to a group (clan, tribe, or larger population) can evolve despite individual disadvantages such as those cited above.
 The idea that intelligence is connected with nutrition, and thereby with status. A higher IQ could be a signal that an individual comes from and lives in a physical and social environment where nutrition levels are high, and vice versa.

Philosophy

Philosophy of mind is the branch of philosophy that studies the nature of the mind, mental events, mental functions, mental properties, consciousness and their relationship to the physical body. The mind–body problem, i.e. the relationship of the mind to the body, is commonly seen as the central issue in philosophy of mind, although there are other issues concerning the nature of the mind that do not involve its relation to the physical body. José Manuel Rodriguez Delgado writes, "In present popular usage, soul and mind are not clearly differentiated and some people, more or less consciously, still feel that the soul, and perhaps the mind, may enter or leave the body as independent entities."

Dualism and monism are the two major schools of thought that attempt to resolve the mind–body problem. Dualism is the position that mind and body are in some way separate from each other. It can be traced back to Plato, Aristotle and the Nyaya, Samkhya and Yoga schools of Hindu philosophy, but it was most precisely formulated by René Descartes in the 17th century. Substance dualists argue that the mind is an independently existing substance, whereas Property dualists maintain that the mind is a group of independent properties that emerge from and cannot be reduced to the brain, but that it is not a distinct substance.

The 20th century philosopher Martin Heidegger suggested that subjective experience and activity (i.e. the "mind") cannot be made sense of in terms of Cartesian "substances" that bear "properties" at all (whether the mind itself is thought of as a distinct, separate kind of substance or not). This is because the nature of subjective, qualitative experience is incoherent in terms of – or semantically incommensurable with the concept of – substances that bear properties. This is a fundamentally ontological argument.

The philosopher of cognitive science Daniel Dennett, for example, argues there is no such thing as a narrative center called the "mind", but that instead there is simply a collection of sensory inputs and outputs: different kinds of "software" running in parallel. Psychologist B.F. Skinner argued that the mind is an explanatory fiction that diverts attention from environmental causes of behavior; he considered the mind a "black box" and thought that mental processes may be better conceived of as forms of covert verbal behavior.

Philosopher David Chalmers has argued that the third person approach to uncovering mind and consciousness is not effective, such as looking into other's brains or observing human conduct, but that a first person approach is necessary.   Such a first person perspective indicates that the mind must be conceptualized as something distinct from the brain.

The mind has also been described as manifesting from moment to moment, one thought moment at a time as a fast flowing stream, where sense impressions and mental phenomena are constantly changing.

Relation to the body

Monism is the position that mind and body are not physiologically and ontologically distinct kinds of entities. This view was first advocated in Western Philosophy by Parmenides in the 5th century BC and was later espoused by the 17th century rationalist Baruch Spinoza. According to Spinoza's dual-aspect theory, mind and body are two aspects of an underlying reality which he variously described as "Nature" or "God".
 Physicalists argue that only the entities postulated by physical theory exist, and that the mind will eventually be explained in terms of these entities as physical theory continues to evolve.
 Idealists maintain that the mind is all that exists and that the external world is either mental itself, or an illusion created by the mind.
 Neutral monists adhere to the position that perceived things in the world can be regarded as either physical or mental depending on whether one is interested in their relationship to other things in the world or their relationship to the perceiver. For example, a red spot on a wall is physical in its dependence on the wall and the pigment of which it is made, but it is mental in so far as its perceived redness depends on the workings of the visual system. Unlike dual-aspect theory, neutral monism does not posit a more fundamental substance of which mind and body are aspects.

The most common monisms in the 20th and 21st centuries have all been variations of physicalism; these positions include behaviorism, the type identity theory, anomalous monism and functionalism.

Many modern philosophers of mind adopt either a reductive or non-reductive physicalist position, maintaining in their different ways that the mind is not something separate from the body. These approaches have been particularly influential in the sciences, e.g. in the fields of sociobiology, computer science, evolutionary psychology and the various neurosciences. Other philosophers, however, adopt a non-physicalist position which challenges the notion that the mind is a purely physical construct.
 Reductive physicalists assert that all mental states and properties will eventually be explained by scientific accounts of physiological processes and states.
 Non-reductive physicalists argue that although the brain is all there is to the mind, the predicates and vocabulary used in mental descriptions and explanations are indispensable, and cannot be reduced to the language and lower-level explanations of physical science.

Continued progress in neuroscience has helped to clarify many of these issues, and its findings have been taken by many to support physicalists' assertions. Nevertheless, our knowledge is incomplete, and modern philosophers of mind continue to discuss how subjective qualia and the intentional mental states can be naturally explained. There is also the problem of Quantum Mechanics, whose Copenhagen interpretation can be understood as a form of perspectivism. As the Copenhagen interpretation is not universally accepted, an exact mechanism of the collapse of the wavefunction remains elusive, and the role of mind in fundamental physical theory is unclear.

Scientific study

Neuroscience

Neuroscience studies the nervous system, the physical basis of the mind. At the systems level, neuroscientists investigate how biological neural networks form and physiologically interact to produce mental functions and content such as reflexes, multisensory integration, motor coordination, circadian rhythms, emotional responses, learning, and memory.  The underlying physical basis of learning and memory is likely dynamic changes in gene expression that occur in brain neurons.  Such expression changes are introduced by epigenetic mechanisms.  Epigenetic regulation of gene expression ordinarily involves chemical modification of DNA or DNA-associated histone proteins.  Such chemical modifications can cause long-lasting changes in gene expression.  Epigenetic mechanisms employed in learning and memory include the DNMT3A promoted methylation and TET promoted demethylation of neuronal DNA as well as methylation, acetylation and deacetylation of neuronal histone proteins. Also, long term excitation of neural pathways and subsequent endocrinal signaling, can provide a capacity for structural activation of gene expression in the histone code; allowing a potential mechanism of throughput epigenetic interaction with the nervous system.

At a larger scale, efforts in computational neuroscience have developed large-scale models that simulate simple, functioning brains. As of 2012, such models include the thalamus, basal ganglia, prefrontal cortex, motor cortex, and occipital cortex, and consequentially simulated brains can learn, respond to visual stimuli, coordinate motor responses, form short-term memories, and learn to respond to patterns. Currently, researchers aim to program the hippocampus and limbic system, hypothetically imbuing the simulated mind with long-term memory and crude emotions.

By contrast, affective neuroscience studies the neural mechanisms of personality, emotion, and mood primarily through experimental tasks.

Cognitive science

Cognitive science examines the mental functions that give rise to information processing, termed cognition. These include perception, attention, working memory, long-term memory, producing and understanding language, learning, reasoning, problem solving, and decision making. Cognitive science seeks to understand thinking "in terms of representational structures in the mind and computational procedures that operate on those structures".

At the birth of cognitive science in the 1960s and 1970s, the paradigm of the computational theory of mind was widely adopted. This paradigm holds that the mind is essentially a computational system, and its explanation needs to be provided in terms of a computational description. More recently, rival paradigms gained ground within cognitive science, namely the neurophysical description and the intentional description.

Though the interface between neuroscience and an exact model of cognition is not yet made, progress in biological neuron models help to mathematically quantify cognitive neuroscience; and elaborate a theory of mind that can be provable. However a theoretically fundamental synthesis in psychology, cognitive science, neuroscience, and biophysics must be made; for the problem of mind and its faculties to gain tractable scientific ground. 

Over the past years, research in cognitive sciences has highlighted the importance of the body for cognition. Proponents of the embodied cognition theory of mind hold that cognition (and mental phenomena) is the product of active interactions between individuals and their surrounding environment.

Psychology

Psychology is the scientific study of human behavior, mental functioning, and experience. As both an academic and applied discipline, Psychology involves the scientific study of mental processes such as perception, cognition, emotion, personality, as well as environmental influences, such as social and cultural influences, and interpersonal relationships, in order to devise theories of human behavior. Psychological patterns can be understood as low cost ways of information processing.  Psychology also refers to the application of such knowledge to various spheres of human activity, including problems of individuals' daily lives and the treatment of mental health problems.

Psychology differs from the other social sciences (e.g. anthropology, economics, political science, and sociology) due to its focus on experimentation at the scale of the individual, or individuals in small groups as opposed to large groups, institutions or societies. Historically, psychology differed from biology and neuroscience in that it was primarily concerned with mind rather than brain. Modern psychological science incorporates physiological and neurological processes into its conceptions of perception, cognition, behaviour, and mental disorders.

Psychiatry, Neurology and Neurosurgery

Psychiatry, Neurology and Neurosurgery are the specialties within the field of Medicine that are devoted to the study of the mind and to the treatment of humans with mental disorders and other medical conditions affecting the mind and nervous system. Psychiatrists, Neurologists and Neurosurgeons conduct research in clinical, academic and industry settings.

Mental health

By analogy with the health of the body, one can speak metaphorically of a state of health of the mind, or mental health. Merriam-Webster defines mental health as "a state of emotional and psychological well-being in which an individual is able to use his or her cognitive and emotional capabilities, function in society, and meet the ordinary demands of everyday life". According to the World Health Organization (WHO), there is no one "official" definition of mental health. Cultural differences, subjective assessments, and competing professional theories all affect how "mental health" is defined. In general, most experts agree that "mental health" and "mental disorder" are not opposites. In other words, the absence of a recognized mental disorder is not necessarily an indicator of mental health.

One way to think about mental health is by looking at how effectively and successfully a person functions. Feeling capable and competent; being able to handle normal levels of stress, maintaining satisfying relationships, and leading an independent life; and being able to "bounce back" or recover from difficult situations, are all signs of mental health.

Psychotherapy is an interpersonal, relational intervention used by trained psychotherapists to aid clients in problems of living. This usually includes increasing individual sense of well-being and reducing subjective discomforting experience. Psychotherapists employ a range of techniques based on experiential relationship building, dialogue, communication and behavior change and that are designed to improve the mental health of a client or patient, or to improve group relationships (such as in a family). Most forms of psychotherapy use only spoken conversation, though some also use various other forms of communication such as the written word, art, drama, narrative story, or therapeutic touch. Psychotherapy occurs within a structured encounter between a trained therapist and client(s). Purposeful, theoretically based psychotherapy began in the 19th century with psychoanalysis; since then, scores of other approaches have been developed and continue to be created.

Non-human

Animal cognition
Animal cognition, or cognitive ethology, is a modern approach to the research and study of the  mental capacities of animals. It has developed out of comparative psychology, and has also been strongly influenced by the approach of ethology, behavioral ecology, and evolutionary psychology. Much of what was formerly known as "animal intelligence" is now thought of under this heading. Animal language acquisition, attempting to discern or understand the degree to which animal cognition can be revealed by linguistics-related study, has been controversial among cognitive linguists.

Artificial intelligence

 In 1950 Alan M. Turing published "Computing machinery and intelligence" in Mind, in which he proposed that machines could be tested for intelligence using questions and answers. This process is now named the Turing Test. The term Artificial Intelligence (AI) was first used by John McCarthy who considered it to mean "the science and engineering of making intelligent machines". It can also refer to intelligence as exhibited by an artificial (man-made, non-natural, manufactured) entity. AI is studied in overlapping fields of computer science, psychology, neuroscience and engineering, dealing with intelligent behavior, learning and adaptation and usually developed using customized machines or computers.

Research in AI is concerned with producing machines to automate tasks requiring intelligent behavior. Examples include control, planning and scheduling, the ability to answer diagnostic and consumer questions, handwriting, natural language, speech and facial recognition. As such, the study of AI has also become an engineering discipline, focused on providing solutions to real life problems, knowledge mining, software applications, strategy games like computer chess and other video games. One of the biggest limitations of AI is in the domain of actual machine comprehension. Consequentially natural-language understanding and connectionism (where behavior of neural networks is investigated) are areas of active research and development.

The debate about the nature of the mind is relevant to the development of artificial intelligence. If the mind is indeed a thing separate from or higher than the functioning of the brain, then hypothetically it would be much more difficult to recreate within a machine, if it were possible at all. If, on the other hand, the mind is no more than the aggregated functions of the brain, then it will be possible to create a machine with a recognisable mind (though possibly only with computers much different from today's), by simple virtue of the fact that such a machine already exists in the form of the human brain.

Religion

Many religions associate spiritual qualities to the human mind. These are often tightly connected to their mythology and ideas of afterlife.

The Indian philosopher-sage Sri Aurobindo attempted to unite the Eastern and Western psychological traditions with his integral psychology, as have many philosophers and New religious movements. Judaism teaches that "moach shalit al halev", the mind rules the heart; humans can approach the Divine intellectually, through learning and behaving according to the Divine Will as enclothed in the Torah, and use that deep logical understanding to elicit and guide emotional arousal during prayer. Christianity has tended to see the mind (Greek nous) as distinct from the soul (Greek psuche) and sometimes further distinguished the spirit (Greek pneuma). Western esoteric traditions sometimes refer to a mental body that exists on a plane other than the physical. Hinduism's various philosophical schools have debated whether the human soul (Sanskrit atman) is distinct from, or identical to, Brahman, the divine reality. Taoism sees the human being as contiguous with natural forces, and the mind as not separate from the body. Confucianism sees the mind, like the body, as inherently perfectible.

Buddhism

Buddhist teachings explain the moment-to-moment manifestation of the mind-stream. The components that make up the mind are known as the five aggregates (i.e., material form, feelings, perception, volition, and sensory consciousness), which arise and pass away continuously. The arising and passing of these aggregates in the present moment is described as being influenced by five causal laws: biological laws, psychological laws, physical laws, volitional laws, and universal laws. The Buddhist practice of mindfulness involves attending to this constantly changing mind-stream.

According to Buddhist philosopher Dharmakirti, the mind has two fundamental qualities: "clarity and cognizes". If something is not those two qualities, it cannot validly be called mind. "Clarity" refers to the fact that mind has no color, shape, size, location, weight, or any other physical characteristic, and "cognizes" that it functions to know or perceive objects. "Knowing" refers to the fact that mind is aware of the contents of experience, and that, in order to exist, mind must be cognizing an object. You cannot have a mind – whose function is to cognize an object – existing without cognizing an object.

Mind, in Buddhism, is also described as being "space-like" and "illusion-like". Mind is space-like in the sense that it is not physically obstructive. It has no qualities which would prevent it from existing. In Mahayana Buddhism, mind is illusion-like in the sense that it is empty of inherent existence. This does not mean it does not exist, it means that it exists in a manner that is counter to our ordinary way of misperceiving how phenomena exist, according to Buddhism. When the mind is itself cognized properly, without misperceiving its mode of existence, it appears to exist like an illusion. There is a big difference however between being "space and illusion" and being "space-like" and "illusion-like". Mind is not composed of space, it just shares some descriptive similarities to space. Mind is not an illusion, it just shares some descriptive qualities with illusions.

Buddhism posits that there is no inherent, unchanging identity (Inherent I, Inherent Me) or phenomena (Ultimate self, inherent self, Atman, Soul, Self-essence, Jiva, Ishvara, humanness essence, etc.) which is the experiencer of our experiences and the agent of our actions. In other words, human beings consist of merely a body and a mind, and nothing extra. Within the body there is no part or set of parts which is – by itself or themselves – the person. Similarly, within the mind there is no part or set of parts which are themselves "the person". A human being merely consists of five aggregates, or skandhas and nothing else.

In the same way, "mind" is what can be validly conceptually labelled onto our mere experience of clarity and knowing. There is something separate and apart from clarity and knowing which is "Awareness", in Buddhism. "Mind" is that part of experience the sixth sense door, which can be validly referred to as mind by the concept-term "mind". There is also not "objects out there, mind in here, and experience somewhere in-between". There is a third thing called "awareness" which exists being aware of the contents of mind and what mind cognizes. There are five senses (arising of mere experience: shapes, colors, the components of smell, components of taste, components of sound, components of touch) and mind as the sixth institution; this means, expressly, that there can be a third thing called "awareness" and a third thing called "experiencer who is aware of the experience". This awareness is deeply related to "no-self" because it does not judge the experience with craving or aversion.

Clearly, the experience arises and is known by mind, but there is a third thing calls Sati what is the "real experiencer of the experience" that sits apart from the experience and which can be aware of the experience in 4 levels. (Maha Sathipatthana Sutta.)
 Body
 Sensations (Changes of the body mind.)
 Mind,
 Contents of the mind. (Changes of the body mind.)

To be aware of these four levels one needs to cultivate equanimity toward Craving and Aversion. This is Called Vipassana which is different from the way of reacting with  Craving and Aversion. This is the state of being aware and equanimous to the complete experience of here and now. This is the way of Buddhism, with regards to mind and the ultimate nature of minds (and persons).

Mortality

Due to the mind–body problem, a lot of interest and debate surrounds the question of what happens to one's conscious mind as one's body dies. During brain death all brain function permanently ceases. According to some neuroscientific views which see these processes as the physical basis of mental phenomena, the mind fails to survive brain death and ceases to exist. This permanent loss of consciousness after death is sometimes called "eternal oblivion". The belief that some spiritual or incorporeal component (soul) exists and that it is preserved after death is described by the term "afterlife".

Parapsychology
Parapsychology is the study of certain types of paranormal phenomena, or of phenomena which appear to be paranormal or not have any scientific basis, such as precognition, telekinesis and telepathy.

The term is based on the Greek para ('beside, beyond'), psyche ('soul, mind'), and logos ('account, explanation') and was coined by psychologist Max Dessoir in or before 1889. J.B. Rhine tried to popularize "parapsychology" using fraudulent techniques as a replacement for the earlier term "psychical research", during a shift in methodologies which brought experimental methods to the study of psychic phenomena. Parapsychology is not accepted among the scientific community as science, as psychic abilities have not been demonstrated to exist. The status of parapsychology as a science has also been disputed, with many scientists regarding the discipline as pseudoscience.

See also
 Outline of human intelligence – topic tree presenting the traits, capacities, models, and research fields of human intelligence, and more.
 Outline of thought – topic tree that identifies many types of thoughts, types of thinking, aspects of thought, related fields, and more.
 Embodied cognition

References

Further reading
 Max Bertolero and Danielle S. Bassett, "How Matter Becomes Mind:  The new discipline of network neuroscience yields a picture of how mental activity arises from carefully orchestrated interactions among different brain areas", Scientific American, vol. 321, no. 1 (July 2019), pp. 26–33.

External links

 

 
 
Brain
Cognitive science
Concepts in metaphysics
Concepts in the philosophy of mind
Consciousness
Intelligence
Metaphysics of mind
Thought